The Pacific Cup was a football tournament held among the Oceania Football Confederation (OFC) member nations. The first tournament was played in 2002. The last tournament was played in 2012.

The tournament involved a round-robin format where every team played each other once at the location of the tournament.

Participating nations

Results

Total Wins

References

 
Pacific Cup
Pacific Cup